Rudolf "Rudek" Regner (1917 in Dolina, Austrian Galicia – probably in June 1941, murdered by the NKVD), was a Polish scout, soldier and member of the White Couriers. Before World War II, he worked as a bookkeeper in a cooperative located in southeastern Polish town of Turka (now in Ukraine).

Between late 1939 and mid-1940, Regner, together with a group of Polish scouts mostly from Lwow, led scores of people across Soviet-Hungarian border (see: Molotov-Ribbentrop Pact) in the Eastern Carpathians. He would lead to Budapest those Poles who wanted to escape Soviet occupation. From Hungary, he would bring newspapers and directives of General Wladyslaw Sikorski. Regner, who was born and raised in the borderland area (before the war, there had been the Polish - Czechoslovakian border), used his knowledge and skills.

Circumstances of his death are unknown. According to some sources, he was captured by the NKVD in May 1940, while leading a group of escapees. However, it is more likely that he was arrested in Komarniki on July 8, 1940 and incarcerated in the Drohobycz military prison. On May 16, 1941, he was sentenced to death by the court of the Kiev Military District. He was shot in Lwow prison in early June 1941, just days before Operation Barbarossa (see: NKVD prisoner massacres).

See also 
Political repression in the Soviet Union
Wladyslaw Ossowski

References 
 Celt, Marek (1986). Biali Kurierzy. Wydawnictwo LTW, Dziekanow Lesny. 
 Szatsznajder, Jan (1994). Dopisany Zyciorys... Wlawa Ossowskiego. Wyd. "W kolorach teczy", Wroclaw
 IPN: Polskie Podziemie 1939-1941. Od Wolynia do Pokucia. cz. 2, Warszawa-Kijow 2004, Wyd. Rytm, str. 1221–1319.

1917 births
1941 deaths
People from Dolyna
Polish resistance members of World War II
Nonpersons in the Eastern Bloc
Polish people who died in Soviet detention
Polish people detained by the NKVD